Tyler Carlton Weir (born 21 December 1990) is an English professional footballer who plays for Evesham United.

Career
Born in Hereford, Herefordshire, he signed a deal with his hometown club Hereford United in Football League Two at the beginning of May 2009. He made his debut for the club in a home defeat to Milton Keynes Dons in the southern section semi-final of the Football League Trophy. On 28 February 2011 he signed for Gloucester City on loan for a month where he scored his first senior goal against Stafford Rangers. After an impressive first month the loan was extended to cover the rest of the season. His form with the Tigers earned him a new one-year contract with the Bulls to keep him at the club for the 2011/2012 season. He re-joined Gloucester City on a months loan in August 2011 in order to provide cover for injuries within the Tigers squad, this was later extended until January where he then joined league rivals Worcester City until the end of the season.

In February 2016, Weir was handed a six-month suspension by The Football Association, of which four-months where suspended until 1 July 2018, for failing to immediately report an "approach by a third party related to seeking to influence the outcome or conduct of a match or competition". The FA also stated, "It is important to note that the three players were not involved in any attempt to fix matches and did not accept monies or gifts".

In the summer 2019, Weir joined Evesham United, but soon left and has been with Newent Town since then.

References

External links

1990 births
Living people
Sportspeople from Hereford
English footballers
Hereford United F.C. players
Gloucester City A.F.C. players
Worcester City F.C. players
Hednesford Town F.C. players
Halesowen Town F.C. players
Evesham United F.C. players
English Football League players
Association football midfielders
20th-century English people
21st-century English people